Aguadito de pollo, also referred to as 'Aguadito', is a traditional chicken soup in Peruvian cuisine consisting of chicken, cilantro and vegetables. The dish is prepared using large chunks of chicken and additional ingredients like chicken hearts, livers and gizzards. Other ingredients used can include potatoes, corn, peas, other vegetables, rice, noodles, red pepper and various spices. It typically has a pronounced green coloration due to a significant amount of cilantro used in the soup.

In Peru, aguadito de pollo is consumed in part for having a theoretical potential for easing or alleviating symptoms associated with the hangover.

See also

 Hangover food
 List of Peruvian dishes

References

External links
 Aguadito de Pollo. Perudelights.com.
 Aprende a preparar la deliciosa receta del aguadito de pollo. Peru.com. 

Peruvian chicken dishes
Chicken soups
Offal dishes